Year 1123 (MCXXIII) was a common year starting on Monday (link will display the full calendar) of the Julian calendar.

Events 
 By place 

 Levant 
 April 18 – King Baldwin II of Jerusalem is captured by Turkish forces under Belek Ghazi – while preparing to practice falconry near Gargar on the Euphrates. Most of the Crusader army is massacred, and Baldwin is taken to the castle at Kharput. To save the situation the Venetians are asked to help. Doge Domenico Michiel lifts the siege of Corfu (see 1122) and takes his fleet to Acre, arriving at the port in the end of May.
 May – Baldwin II and Joscelin I are rescued by 50 Armenian soldiers (disguised as monks and merchants) at Kharput. They kill the guards, and infiltrate the castle where the prisoners are kept. Joscelin escapes to seek help. However, the castle is soon besieged by Turkish forces under Belek Ghazi – and is after some time recaptured. Baldwin and Waleran of Le Puiset are moved for greater safety to the castle of Harran.
 May 29 – Battle of Yibneh: A Crusader army led by Eustace Grenier defeats the Fatimid forces (16,000 men) near Ibelin. Despite the numerical superiority, Vizier Al-Ma'mun al-Bata'ihi is forced to withdraw to Egypt while his camp is plundered by the Crusaders. Eustace returns to Jerusalem in triumph, but later dies on June 15. 
 May 30 – The Venetian fleet arrives at Ascalon and instantly sets about attacking the Fatimid fleet. The Egyptians fall into a trap, caught between two Venetian squadrons, and are destroyed or captured. While sailing back to Acre, the Venetians capture a merchant-fleet of ten richly laden vessels.
 The Pactum Warmundi: A treaty of alliance, is established between the Kingdom of Jerusalem and the Republic of Venice at Acre. The Venetians receive a street, with a church, baths and a bakery, free of all obligations, in every town of the kingdom. They are also excused of all tolls and taxes.

 Europe 
 August 29 – King Eystein I (Magnusson) dies during a feast at Hustad after a 20-year reign, leaving his brother Sigurd the Crusader to rule over Norway.
 Sigurd I performs a Crusade, the Kalmare ledung, to Christianize the Swedish province of Småland. He makes a pact with King Niels of Denmark.

 England 
 March 25 – St Bartholomew’s Hospital, commonly known as Barts, is founded by Rahere, a favourite courtier of King Henry I; it is now the oldest hospital in the United Kingdom operating on its original site.
 May 9 – A fire in the city of Lincoln nearly destroys the Lincolnshire town; it is memorialized 600 years later by historian Paul de Rapin. 

 Africa 
 August 9 – Battle of Al-Dimas: An Italo-Norman campaign in North Africa ends with their troops being massacred by Zirid forces near Mahdia (modern Tunisia).

 Asia 
 February 25 – Emperor Toba abdicates in favor of his 3-year-old son Sutoku after a 16-year reign. Retired-Emperor Shirakawa rules as regent over Japan.

 By topic 

 Religion 
 March 18 – First Council of the Lateran convenes in Rome; it confirms the Concordat of Worms (see 1122) and demands clerical celibacy in the Catholic Church.
 Diego Gelmírez, archbishop of Santiago de Compostela, declares a Crusade in Al-Andalus (modern Spain) against the Almoravids.
 The priory church of St Bartholomew-the-Great and St Bartholomew's Hospital (Barts) in London are founded by Rahere.
 Furness Abbey (or St Mary of Furness) is founded in England by Stephen, count of Boulogne, for the Order of Savigny.

Births 
 March 29 – Shi Zong (or Wulu), Chinese emperor (d. 1189)
 Minamoto no Yoshitomo, Japanese general (d. 1160)
 Osbern of Gloucester, English lexicographer (d. 1200) 
 Parakramabahu I, Sri Lankan king of Polonnaruwa (d. 1186)
 Robert I (the Great), count of Dreux (approximate date)

Deaths 
 February 9 – Otto (the Rich), count of Ballenstedt (b. 1070)
 March 4 – Peter of Pappacarbone, Italian abbot and bishop
 May 3 – Felicia of Roucy, queen of Aragon and Navarre
 June 15 – Eustace Grenier, French constable and regent 
 July 18 – Bruno di Segni, Italian prelate and bishop
 August 29 – Eystein I (Magnusson), king of Norway
 September 11 – Marbodius of Rennes, French archdeacon
 September 19 – Taizu, emperor of the Jin Dynasty (b. 1068)
 September 27 – Fujiwara no Akisue, Japanese nobleman (b. 1055)
 December 14 – Henry IV, duke of Carinthia (House of Sponheim)
 Davyd Sviatoslavich, Kievan prince of Murom and Chernigov
 Henry II, margrave of Meissen and the Saxon Ostmark (b. 1103)
 Langri Tangpa, Tibetan Buddhist monk and master (b. 1054)
 Louis the Springer (or Leaper), German nobleman (b. 1042)

References 

 

da:1120'erne#1123